The Mysterious Avenger is a 1936 American Western film directed by David Selman. It features an early appearance by Jon Hall.

Cast
 Charles Starrett	... 	Ranny Maitland / Ranny Morgan
 Joan Perry	... 	Alice Lockhart
 Wheeler Oakman	... 	Brophy
 Edward LeSaint	... 	Lockhart
 Lafe McKee	... 	Maitland
 Hal Price	... 	Sheriff
 Jon Hall	... 	Lafe Lockhart (as Charles Locher)
 George Chesebro	... 	Henchman Foley
 Sons of the Pioneers... 	Musicians & Rangers
 Roy Rogers	... 	Musician Len (as Len Slye)
 Bob Nolan	... 	Musician Bob (as Sons of the Pioneers)
 Hugh Farr	... 	Musician Hugh (as Sons of the Pioneers)
 Karl Farr	... 	Musician Karl (as Sons of the Pioneers)
 Tim Spencer	... 	Musician Tim (as Sons of the Pioneers)
 Jack Carlyle ... 	Texas Rangers Captain

References

External links 
 

1936 films
1936 Western (genre) films
American Western (genre) films
American black-and-white films
Columbia Pictures films
1930s English-language films
Films directed by David Selman
1930s American films